Expedition 34 was the 34th long-duration expedition to the International Space Station (ISS). It began on 18 November 2012 with the departure from the ISS of the Soyuz TMA-05M spacecraft, which returned the Expedition 33 crew to Earth.

Crew

Source NASA

Mission Objectives
Some of the science objectives included investigations of the human cardiovascular system in space, studies on fish and their sensation of gravity, and the impacts of solar radiation on Earth's climate.  During the expedition, the robotic platform Robonaut, a humanoid robot test platform, continued testing.

References

External links

NASA's Space Station Expeditions page

Expeditions to the International Space Station
2012 in spaceflight
2013 in spaceflight